The 2012 Basque regional election was held on Sunday, 21 October 2012, to elect the 10th Parliament of the Basque Autonomous Community. All 75 seats in the Parliament were up for election. The election was held simultaneously with a regional election in Galicia. Lehendakari Patxi López announced the parliament's dissolution half a year ahead of schedule as a result of the People's Party (PP) withdrawing their support from his government, prompting Galician president Alberto Núñez Feijóo, who had been scheduling a snap election in Galicia to be held at some point throughout late 2012, to make his decision to have a simultaneous vote.

The election saw a heavy defeat for the ruling Socialist Party of the Basque Country–Basque Country Left (PSE–EE), with the Basque Nationalist Party (PNV) retaining first place with a slightly diminished support. In the first electoral campaign without ETA—the band had announced a "definitive cessation of its armed activity" in October 2011—the abertzale left experienced a major breakthrough under the EH Bildu label nine years after the illegalization of Batasuna, obtaining a record result with 21 seats and 24.7% of the share. The PP deepened on its long-term decline and, with 11.6% and 10 seats, scored its worst result since 1990, while Union, Progress and Democracy (UPyD) retained its single seat in parliament. Altogether, the bloc formed by the PSE–EE, PP and UPyD which had supported López in 2009 was reduced from 39 to 27 seats.

Iñigo Urkullu of the PNV became the new lehendakari, forming a minority government with the sole support of his party after three-and-a-half years in opposition. Under Urkullu, the PNV would see an ideological realignment from former lehendakari Juan José Ibarretxe's sovereigntist stance and confrontational style towards more moderate, pragmatic and big tent positions.

Overview

Electoral system
The Basque Parliament was the devolved, unicameral legislature of the autonomous community of the Basque Country, having legislative power in regional matters as defined by the Spanish Constitution of 1978 and the regional Statute of Autonomy, as well as the ability to vote confidence in or withdraw it from a lehendakari.

Voting for the Parliament was on the basis of universal suffrage, which comprised all nationals over 18 years of age, registered in the Basque Country and in full enjoyment of their political rights. Additionally, Basques abroad were required to apply for voting before being permitted to vote, a system known as "begged" or expat vote. The 75 members of the Basque Parliament were elected using the D'Hondt method and a closed list proportional representation, with an electoral threshold of three percent of valid votes—which included blank ballots—being applied in each constituency. Seats were allocated to constituencies, corresponding to the provinces of Álava, Biscay and Gipuzkoa, being allocated a fixed number of 25 seats each to provide for an equal representation of the three provinces in parliament as required under the regional statute of autonomy. This meant that Álava was allocated the same number of seats as Biscay and Gipuzkoa, despite their populations being, as of 1 July 2012: 319,786, 1,152,156 and 708,042, respectively.

The use of the D'Hondt method might result in a higher effective threshold, depending on the district magnitude.

Election date
The term of the Basque Parliament expired four years after the date of its previous election, unless it was dissolved earlier. The election decree was required to be issued no later than the twenty-fifth day prior to the date of expiry of parliament and published on the following day in the Official Gazette of the Basque Country (BOPV), with election day taking place on the fifty-fourth day from publication. The previous election was held on 1 March 2009, which meant that the legislature's term would have expired on 1 March 2013. The election decree was required to be published in the BOPV no later than 5 February 2013, with the election taking place on the fifty-fourth day from publication, setting the latest possible election date for the Parliament on Sunday, 31 March 2013.

The lehendakari had the prerogative to dissolve the Basque Parliament at any given time and call a snap election, provided that no motion of no confidence was in process. In the event of an investiture process failing to elect a lehendakari within a sixty-day period from the Parliament re-assembly, the Parliament was to be dissolved and a fresh election called.

The People's Party (PP), on whose confidence and supply the López's government relied, withdrew their support in May 2012 claiming "difficulties in finding meeting points" with the Socialist Party of the Basque Country–Basque Country Left (PSE–EE), leaving López in a clear minority. While initially intending to reach the end of the legislature, mounting pressure from both the PP and the Basque Nationalist Party (PNV) led López to announce on 21 August that he would be dissolving parliament and call a snap election for 21 October 2012 over an impossibility to keep carrying out the government's legislative agenda.

Background
Following the 2009 regional election, Patxi López of the PSE–EE became lehendakari through a confidence and supply agreement with the PP, bringing an end to 30 years of uninterrupted rule by the Basque Nationalist Party (PNV) and sending the party to opposition in the regional parliament for the first time since the Spanish transition to democracy. The local PSE–PP alliance endured the historical rivalry at the national level between the two parties, despite suffering from frequent clashes as the PP set out a series of conditions for maintaining their support, as well as a steady opposition from the PNV. In May 2012, some months after winning the 2011 Spanish general election and forming the new Spanish government, the PP terminated the alliance in retaliation to the PSOE's opposition to Prime Minister Mariano Rajoy's reform agenda, prompting Patxi López to announce a snap regional election for October 2012.

On 5 September 2010, ETA declared a ceasefire at a time when it found itself militarily weakened by police action—the group had been unable to stage any attack in Spanish territory since 9 August 2009—and beleaguered by infighting, distrust in the operational capacities and reliability of its members and pressures from abertzale left groups (which were being kept politically outlawed by Spanish courts) for the band to stop the killings. On 10 January 2011, ETA proclaimed its will for the September 2010 ceasefire to be "permanent, general and verifiable" by international observers. Three days after the Donostia-San Sebastián International Peace Conference held on 17 October 2011, ETA would announce a "definitive cessation of its armed activity".

In April 2011, following the illegalization of Sortu in March—perceived as a continuation of Batasuna, the banned political branch of the ETA terrorist group—Eusko Alkartasuna (EA), Alternatiba and groups and independent individuals from the abertzale left formed a coalition named Bildu to contest the incoming 2011 local elections. Despite an early ruling by the Supreme Court on 2 May which barred Bildu from contesting, the Constitutional Court overturned the ban and allowed the coalition to run in the elections, in which it secured a major breakthrough by obtaining 25.6% and a majority of town councillors in the Basque Country. Aralar would join the coalition in late 2011 ahead of the 20 November general election under the Amaiur umbrella, which came second in the Basque Country with 24.1% of the vote, behind the PNV with 27.4%; in seats, however, Amaiur came out in top with six against the PNV's five. Subsequently, the four main groups that constituted Amaiur, namely Sortu—which would be legalized by the Constitutional Court in June 2012—EA, Alternatiba and Aralar, announced the establishment of EH Bildu as a joint electoral list ahead of the next Basque regional election, with Laura Mintegi being nominated as the alliance's candidate for lehendakari.

Parliamentary composition
The Basque Parliament was officially dissolved on 28 August 2012, after the publication of the dissolution decree in the Official Gazette of the Basque Country. The table below shows the composition of the parliamentary groups in the chamber at the time of dissolution.

Parties and candidates
The electoral law allowed for parties and federations registered in the interior ministry, coalitions and groupings of electors to present lists of candidates. Parties and federations intending to form a coalition ahead of an election were required to inform the relevant Electoral Commission within ten days of the election call, whereas groupings of electors needed to secure the signature of at least one percent of the electorate in the constituencies for which they sought election, disallowing electors from signing for more than one list of candidates.

Below is a list of the main parties and electoral alliances which contested the election:

Opinion polls
The table below lists voting intention estimates in reverse chronological order, showing the most recent first and using the dates when the survey fieldwork was done, as opposed to the date of publication. Where the fieldwork dates are unknown, the date of publication is given instead. The highest percentage figure in each polling survey is displayed with its background shaded in the leading party's colour. If a tie ensues, this is applied to the figures with the highest percentages. The "Lead" column on the right shows the percentage-point difference between the parties with the highest percentages in a poll. When available, seat projections determined by the polling organisations are displayed below (or in place of) the percentages in a smaller font; 38 seats were required for an absolute majority in the Basque Parliament.

Results

Overall

Distribution by constituency

Aftermath

Notes

References
Opinion poll sources

Other

2012 in the Basque Country (autonomous community)
Basque Country
Regional elections in the Basque Country (autonomous community)
October 2012 events in Europe